Halton East is a village and civil parish in North Yorkshire, England,  east of Skipton.  The population of the parish was estimated at 90 in 2015.

The place was first recorded in the Domesday Book as Haltone.  The name is derived from the Old English halh 'nook' and tūn 'farm or village', so means 'farm or village by a nook'. "East" was added to distinguish the village from another Halton, now Halton West,  to the west.

Halton East was historically a township in the large ancient parish of Skipton in the West Riding of Yorkshire.  It became a separate civil parish in 1866.  In 1974 it was transferred to the new county of North Yorkshire.

References

External links

Villages in North Yorkshire
Civil parishes in North Yorkshire